Ryszard Czerwiński (born 31 October 1954) is a Polish boxer. He competed in the men's bantamweight event at the 1980 Summer Olympics.

References

1954 births
Living people
Polish male boxers
Olympic boxers of Poland
Boxers at the 1980 Summer Olympics
Sportspeople from Gorzów Wielkopolski
Bantamweight boxers
20th-century Polish people
21st-century Polish people